Rope jumping, also known as rope free-flying, falling is the extreme sport of jumping off a cliff while anchored to a highline system with a rope. This is notably different from bungee jumping as there is little stretch in the rope, allowing the jumper to have a longer freefall, stopping closer to the ground. Rope jumping is a highly dangerous sport that requires extensive knowledge and preparation to be done safely.

Rope jumping deaths
Dan Osman died due to the failure of a rope jump anchor system in Yosemite National Park on November 23, 1998.

References 

Jumping sports
Outdoor recreation